The 2021 All Japan High School Soccer Tournament (All Japan JFA 100th High School Soccer Tournament (Japanese: 第100回全国高等学校サッカー選手権大会)) marked the 100th edition of the referred annually contested cup for High Schools over Japan. As usual, the tournament was contested by 48 High Schools, with 1 High School per Prefecture being qualified for the tournament, with an exception made for the Tokyo, which have 2 High School representing their Prefecture. The final was played at the Japan National Stadium, in Tokyo.

The Yamanashi Gakuin High School were the defending champions, after winning the 2020 edition, winning over Aomori Yamada by 4–2 on a penalty shoot-out. However, they were eliminated in their first match on the 2021 tournament, losing 2–0 to Saga Higashi. In the end, Aomori Yamada won their 3rd title, with a 4–0 win in the final against Kumamoto Ozu, who qualified for the final over Kanto Daiichi's withdrawal on the semi-finals, due to coronavirus-related issues that prevented their participation on the semi-finals.

Calendar
The tournament took place in a 14-day span, with the tournament split in a total of 6 stages. The schedule was decided on 13 August 2021 by the JFA.

Venues
The tournament was played in four prefectures and nine stadiums, with six (two for each prefecture) located in Chiba, Kanagawa, and Saitama Prefectures, and three located in Tokyo. They are:

Tokyo – Japan National Stadium, Ajinomoto Field Nishigaoka, and Komazawa Olympic Park Stadium
Saitama – Kumagaya Athletic Stadium and NACK5 Stadium Omiya
Kanagawa – NHK Spring Mitsuzawa Football Stadium and Kawasaki Todoroki Stadium
Chiba – Fukuda Denshi Arena and Kashiwanoha Stadium

Participating clubs
In parentheses: the amount of times each team qualified for the All Japan High School Tournament (appearance in the 2021 edition included)

Schedule
The draw to decide the match pairings was conducted on 15 November.

First round

Second round

Third round

Quarter-finals

Semi-finals

Final

Selected Best Players
The following 37 players featured in the Tournament's Best Players Squad:

References

External links
Official Schedule (Goal)
Official Schedule (JFA)
About the Tournament (JFA)

Football competitions in Japan
Youth football competitions
2021 in Japanese football